Adalhelm of Autun was a Frankish nobleman of the 8th and 9th centuries from the Wilhelmid family, son of Thierry IV and the Carolingian Alda.

He was called as a witness in the charters of the foundation of the abbey of Gellone by his brother William, 15 December 804. Two other brothers signed these charters: Theodoen and a Thierry who is not mentioned in any charters.

That is the only ascertainable information about Adalhelm himself. On the basis of onomastics, two children have been assigned to him:

Waldrada, wife of Adrian, Count of Orléans, count palatine of the Agilolfing family, brother of Hildegard, wife of Charlemagne.
Bernard I , count of Poitiers in 815 and in 825.

Medieval French nobility
8th-century births
Nobility of the Carolingian Empire
Year of death unknown
Year of birth unknown